Henry Wynne Denman (5 July 1929 – 28 December 2002) was an English first-class cricketer.

Denman was born at Liverpool in July 1929 and later studied at Magdalene College, Cambridge. While studying at Cambridge, he played first-class cricket for Cambridge University Cricket Club from 1950 to 1952, making seven appearances. Playing as a wicket-keeper in the Cambridge side, he took five catches and made two stumpings in this capacity, while as a batsman he scored 4 runs. Denman died at Kensington in December 2002.

References

External links

1929 births
2002 deaths
Cricketers from Liverpool
Alumni of Magdalene College, Cambridge
English cricketers
Cambridge University cricketers